Drillia allionii is an extinct species of sea snail, a marine gastropod mollusk in the family Drilliidae.

Description

Distribution
Fossils of this species have been found in Pliocene strata of Greece and Italy, and in Miocene strata of Greece; age range: 11.608 to 2.588 Ma.

References

 Cossmann (M.), 1896 Essais de Paléoconchologie comparée (2ème livraison), pp. 1–179

allionii
Gastropods described in 1877